The Wallowa County Chieftain Building in Enterprise, Oregon is a historic building of the Wallowa County Chieftain newspaper that was listed on the National Register of Historic Places in 2012.

It is significant for its association with the Wallowa County Chieftain, which has run since 1884 and has served the county with general news and, at times, with controversy.

It is one of a few surviving historic buildings in Enterprise constructed of local "Bowlby stone";  others are the NRHP-listed Wallowa County Courthouse and the Burnaugh Building.; This building was built for the newspaper in 1915 or 1916  the newspaper itself has moved on to a new location at 209 N. 1st St. in Enterprise.

References

External links 

Photo, at University of Oregon Libraries, along with 12 more

National Register of Historic Places in Wallowa County, Oregon
Buildings designated early commercial in the National Register of Historic Places
Buildings and structures completed in 1917
Buildings and structures in Enterprise, Oregon